Martha Maria Pacold (born February 3, 1979) is a United States district judge of the United States District Court for the Northern District of Illinois.

Education 

Pacold was educated at St. Ignatius College Prep in Chicago. She earned her Bachelor of Arts with highest distinction, from Indiana University, where she was inducted into Phi Beta Kappa, and her Juris Doctor with honors, from the University of Chicago Law School, where she was inducted into the Order of the Coif and served as Editor-in-Chief of the University of Chicago Law Review.

Legal career 

After graduating from law school, Pacold served as a law clerk for Judge A. Raymond Randolph of the United States Court of Appeals for the District of Columbia Circuit from 2002 to 2003 and for Judge Jay Bybee of the United States Court of Appeals for the Ninth Circuit from 2003 to 2004. She later clerked for Associate Justice Clarence Thomas of the Supreme Court of the United States during the 2004–2005 term.

During her career, she served as a Counsel to the Attorney General at the United States Department of Justice from 2005 to 2006 and a Special Assistant United States Attorney for the Eastern District of Virginia from 2006 to 2007. She was previously an associate and then a partner in the Chicago office of Bartlit Beck Herman Palenchar & Scott, LLP. Pacold was also a Lecturer in Law at the University of Chicago Law School. She previously served as a Deputy General Counsel of the United States Department of the Treasury.

Federal judicial service 

On June 7, 2018, President Donald Trump announced his intent to nominate Pacold to serve as a United States district judge of the United States District Court for the Northern District of Illinois. On June 11, 2018, her nomination was sent to the Senate. President Trump nominated Pacold to the seat vacated by John W. Darrah, who assumed senior status on March 1, 2017. On August 22, 2018, a hearing on her nomination was held before the Senate Judiciary Committee. On October 11, 2018, her nomination was reported out of committee by an 18–3 vote.

On January 3, 2019, her nomination was returned to the President under Rule XXXI, Paragraph 6 of the United States Senate. On April 8, 2019, President Trump announced the renomination of Pacold to the district court. On May 21, 2019, her nomination was sent to the Senate. On June 20, 2019, her nomination was reported out of committee by a 18–4 vote. On July 30, 2019, the Senate voted 86–2 to invoke cloture on her nomination. On July 31, 2019, her nomination was confirmed by a 87–3 vote. She received her judicial commission on August 19, 2019.

On September 9, 2020, President Trump included her on a list of potential nominees to the Supreme Court.

Memberships 

She was a member of the Federalist Society from approximately 2000–2008.

See also 
 List of Asian American jurists
 List of first women lawyers and judges in Illinois
 List of law clerks of the Supreme Court of the United States (Seat 10)
 Donald Trump Supreme Court candidates

References

External links 
 

1979 births
Living people
21st-century American women lawyers
21st-century American lawyers
21st-century American judges
21st-century American women judges
Assistant United States Attorneys
Federalist Society members
Indiana University alumni
Judges of the United States District Court for the Northern District of Illinois
Law clerks of the Supreme Court of the United States
Lawyers from Richmond, Virginia
Trump administration personnel
United States Department of Justice lawyers
United States Department of the Treasury officials
United States district court judges appointed by Donald Trump
University of Chicago Law School alumni
University of Chicago Law School faculty
American women legal scholars